Frohnau is a village in the Saxon town of Annaberg-Buchholz in the district of Erzgebirgskreis in southeast Germany. The discovery of silver on the Schreckenberg led in 1496 to the foundation of the neighbouring mining town of Annaberg. The village of Frohnau is best known for its museum of technology, the Frohnauer Hammer, and the visitor mine of Markus Röhling Stolln. The mining area around Frohnau has been selected as a candidate for a UNESCO World Heritage Site: the Ore Mountain Mining Region (Montanregion Erzgebirge).

Geography 

The Waldhufendorf of Frohnau is located about a kilometre west of the town centre of Annaberg. The lower part of the village is located in the valley of the Sehma river on the Staatsstraße S261. The village runs along a steep village street in a western direction up to the heights of the Schreckenberg.

History 
From 1952 to 1990, Frohnau was part of the Bezirk Karl-Marx-Stadt of East Germany.

Sources 
 
 Lothar Klapper: 600 Jahre Frohnau. Streifzüge durch Geschichte des oberen Erzgebirges, Heft 8, 1997
 Lothar Klapper: Die Frohnauer Schule im Wandel der Zeiten. Streifzüge durch Geschichte des oberen Erzgebirges, Heft 76, 2009

References

External links 
 

Annaberg-Buchholz
Erzgebirgskreis
Mining in the Ore Mountains